Neasura buruana is a moth of the subfamily Arctiinae. It was described by van Eecke in 1929. It is found on Buru.

References

 Natural History Museum Lepidoptera generic names catalog

Lithosiini
Moths described in 1929